or  is a lake that lies in the municipality of Vefsn in Nordland county, Norway.  The water flows out of the  lake to the north into the lake Hundålvatnet.  It is located just north of the Lomsdal–Visten National Park.

See also
 List of lakes in Norway
 Geography of Norway

References

Lakes of Nordland
Vefsn